Several vessels have been named Bloom.

Bloom (1781 ship)
  was launched in the Thirteen Colonies in 1781. She was taken in prize in 1782. She became a Liverpool-based slave ship and from 1783 on made four complete voyages in the triangular trade in enslaved people. She was broken up in 1789.

Bloom (1789 ship)
  was launched in 1789 at Liverpool as a Guineaman. She made three complete voyages as a slave ship in the triangular trade in enslaved people. She then made a voyage as a West Indiaman, before trading between Cork and Liverpool. She was last listed in 1799.

Other
 Bloom, Rossiter, master, foundered on 14 September 1805 while sailing from Delaware to Bilbao. Two men drowned.

Citations

Ship names